Black & Grey is an extended play by Canadian pop rock band Black & Grey. It was released November 30, 2013 in Canada and was recorded at Soundpark Studios.

The EP features guest vocals from singer/songwriter Christina Maryanna Phillips on the track "Broken," and rapper/hip hop artist Blake Francis (a.k.a. BnE) from the group City Natives on the track "What Makes You Who You Are," and was produced and engineered by the ECMA award-winning music producer Jamie Foulds.

Track listing

Credits

Black and Grey
 Brandon Johnson – vocals, rhythm guitar,
 Mike Mellen – lead guitar
 Tyler Mellen – bass guitar
 Daniel Paul – drums

Other personnel
 Jamie Foulds – keyboards, backing vocals, mixing, engineering, mastering
Christina Maryanna Phillips – vocals, guest vocals
Blake Francis – vocals, guest vocals
Matthew Ingraham – photography

Release history

References

2013 EPs
Black & Grey albums
Pop rock EPs